Nekropsi (founded in 1989 as "Necropsy") is a musical group from Istanbul, Turkey. After the release of their four track thrash metal demo Speed Lessons Part I in 1992, their sound has evolved into a new hybrid and become eclectic with the release of the first full-length album Mi Kubbesi, making their music difficult to categorize, fusing elements from genres such as progressive rock, thrash metal, electronica and noise. Following a ten-year hiatus, they released their second full-length album Sayı 2: 10 Yılda Bir Çıkar. Mi Kubbesi was re-released as 1998 by Peyote Müzik in 2010.

Discography

Albums
 Mi Kubbesi – Ada Müzik, 1996
 Sayı 2: 10 Yılda Bir Çıkar – A.K. Müzik, 2007
 1998 – Peyote Müzik, 2010
 Aylık/Monthly – (digital), bandcamp 2013 * (CD), A.K. Müzik 2014

Singles
 Ta Ta Du - (digital), bandcamp 2018
 Sekizler - (digital), bandcamp 2018

Compilations
 Sular Yükseliyor – Ada Müzik, 1996

Other releases
 Speed Lessons Part 1 – Demo, 1992

Live appearances
2001 – Nekropsi, Les Enfants des autres – Institut français d'Istanbul, Turkey
1998 – Jimmy Page & Robert Plant, Nekropsi – Istanbul, Turkey

Personnel

Current
 Cem Ömeroğlu – Guitars, Vocals
 Cevdet Erek – Drums, Vocals
 Kerem Tüzün – Bass, Vocals
 Gökhan Goralı – Guitars

Former
 Tolga Yenilmez – Guitars, Vocals
 :fr:Patrick Chartol – Bass (1998–2001)
 Mehmet Fırıl – Bass (1998)
 Cenk Turanlı – Bass (1994–1998)
 Umut Gürbüz – Bass (1991–1993)

External links 
 
 Nekropsi / Kontraplak Vimeo
 Nekropsi at culturebase.net
  Mi Kubbesi Review
 Interview in Hürriyet
 Review in Milliyet
 Album review in Sabah

References 

Turkish experimental musical groups
Turkish electronic music groups
Turkish thrash metal musical groups
Avant-garde metal musical groups
Noise musical groups
Turkish progressive rock groups
Turkish industrial music groups
Musical groups established in 1989
Musical groups from Istanbul